Tried & True: The Best of Suzanne Vega is a greatest hits album by the American singer/songwriter Suzanne Vega. The album was first released on 28 September 1998 and includes two songs ("Book & a Cover" and "Rosemary") that were not available on her earlier studio albums. Her next compilation album (Retrospective: The Best of Suzanne Vega) is very similar to this album, and includes several more tracks, but lacks "Book & a Cover".

Track listing

Charts

Certifications

References 

1998 greatest hits albums
Suzanne Vega albums